Founded in 1969, ASCA is an Italian news agency based in Rome. It is owned by the Italian businessman Giancarlo Abete through Gruppo Abete (who also own a majority stake in APCOM).

References

External links 
ASCA news

1969 establishments in Italy
News agencies based in Italy
Mass media in Rome